The Appendix Probi ("Probus' Appendix") is the conventional name for a series of five documents believed to have been copied in the seventh or eighth century in Bobbio, Italy. Its name derives from the fact that the documents were found attached to a copy of the Instituta Artium, a treatise named after (but probably not written by) the first-century grammarian Marcus Valerius Probus.

The Appendix was likely composed in Rome around the first half of the fourth century AD.

It is specifically the third of the five documents that has attracted scholarly attention, as it contains a list of 227 spelling mistakes, along with their corrections, which shed light on the phonological and grammatical changes that the local vernacular was experiencing in the early stages of its development into Romance.

The text survives only in a carelessly transcribed water-damaged manuscript of the 7th or 8th century which is kept at the Biblioteca Nazionale Vittorio Emanuele III as MS Lat. 1 (formerly Vindobonensis 17).

Phenomena visible in the spelling mistakes 
Note that the format is "[correct spelling], not [incorrect spelling]". Scribal abbreviations have been expanded and some forms have been edited according to textual criticism.

Syncope

 speculum non speclum
 masculus non masclus
 uernaculus non uernaclus
 angulus non anglus
 uetulus non ueclus
 uitulus non uiclus
 articulus non articlus
 oculus non oclus
 calida non calda
 uiridis non uirdis

Development of yod from front vowels in hiatus 

 uinea non uinia
 cauea non cauia
 lancea non lancia
 ostium non osteum
 lilium non lileum
 alium non aleum
 tolonium non toloneum

Change of /ŭ/ to [o] 

 columna non colomna
 turma non torma
 coluber non colober

Reduction of pretonic /au̯/ to [o] 

 auris non oricla

Loss of final /m/ 

 pridem non pride
 olim non oli
 idem non ide
 nunquam non nunqua
 passim non passi

Loss of /h/ 

 adhuc non aduc
 hostiae non ostiae

Reduction of /-ns-/ to /-s-/ 

 mensa non mesa
 ansa non asa
 formosus non formunsus
 hercules non herculens
 occasio non occansio

Loss of intervocalic /β/ before a back vowel 

 riuus non rius
 flauus non flaus
 auus non aus
 pauor non paor

Confusion of /b/ and /β/ 

 baculus non uaclus
 brauium non brabium
 alueus non albeus
 plebes non pleuis
 uapulo non baplo

Confusion of singletons and geminates 

 camera non cammara
 garrulus non garulus
 basilica non bassilica
 aqua non acqua
 draco non dracco

Elimination of imparisyllabic nouns 

 grus non gruis
 pecten non pectinis
 glis non glirus

Adaptation of 3rd-decl. adjectives to the 1st class 

 tristis non tristus
 pauper mulier non paupera mulier
 acre non acrum
 ipse non ipsus

Adaptation of 4th-decl. feminine nouns to the 1st decl. 

 nurus non nura
 socrus non socra

Adaptation of 3rd/4th decl. feminines to the 1st decl. via diminutive suffix 

 auris non oricla
 fax non facla
 neptis non nepticla
 anus non anucla

Adaptation of neuter plural to the first declension 

 uico castrorum non uico castrae

Elimination of the ablative 

 nobiscum non noscum
 uobiscum non uoscum

Alteration of nom. -es (in the third declension) to -is 

 cautes non cautis
 tabes non tabis
 uates non uatis
 uulpes non uulpis
 fames non famis
 sedes non sedis

Reduction of the endings -es and -is to -s 
 orbis non orbs
 nubes non nubs

Loss of the masculine flexion -us 

 figulus non figel
 masculus non mascel
 barbarus non barbar

Metathesis, assimilation, dissimilation, etc. 

 persica non pessica
 iuniperus non ieniperus
 grundio non grunnio
 sibilus non sifilus
 pegma non peuma
 coqus non cocus
 coquens non cocens 
 coqui non coci

See also 

 Reichenau Glossary
 Proto-Romance language
 Phonological changes from Classical Latin to Proto-Romance

Notes

References

Sources
Barnett, F. J. 2007. The sources of the "Appendix Probi": A new approach. The Classical Quarterly 57(2). 701–736.  doi:10.1017/s000983880700064x.
Elcock, William Dennis. 1960. The Romance Languages. London: Faber & Faber.
Rohfls, Gerhard. 1969. Sermo Vulgaris Latinus: Vulgarlateinisches Lesebuch. 2nd edn. Tübingen: Max Niemeyer Verlag.
Leppänen, V., & Alho, T. 2018. On The Mergers Of Latin Close-Mid Vowels. Transactions of the Philological Society. doi:10.1111/1467-968x.12130
Powell, Jonathan G. F. 2007. A new text of the "Appendix Probi". The Classical Quarterly 57(2). 687–700. doi:10.1017/S0009838807000638.
Quirk, Ronald J. 2005. The “Appendix Probi” as a compendium of Popular Latin: Description and bibliography. The Classical World 98(4). 397–409. doi:10.2307/4352974
Quirk, Ronald J. 2006. The Appendix Probi: A scholar's guide to text and context. Newark: Juan de la Cuesta.
Quirk, Ronald J. 2017. Hypercorrection in the Appendix Probi. Philologus 161(2). 350–353. doi:10.1515/phil-2016-0119

External links
Transcription of the Appendix Probi by Sean Crist, following W. A. Baehrens, 1922, Sprachlicher Kommentar zur vulgärlateinischen Appendix Probi.

Latin texts
Linguistic purism
Palimpsests